The Manwar Sangam Express is an Express train belonging to North Central Railway zone that runs between  and  in India. It is currently being operated with 14231/14232 train numbers on five days in a week for every direction.

Service

The 14231/Manwar Sangam Express has an average speed of 44 km/hr and covers 267 km in 6h 40m. The 14232/Manwar Sangam Express has an average speed of 38 km/hr and covers 267 km in 6h 40m.

Route and halts 

The important halts of the train are:

Coach composition

The train has standard ICF rakes with max speed of 110 kmph. The train consists of 12 coaches :

 1 AC Chair Car 
 2 Chair Car 
 7 General
 2 Seating cum Luggage Rake

Traction

Both trains are hauled by a GONDA Loco Shed-based WAP - 4 , WAP - 7 ELECTRIC locomotive from Prayagraj Junction to Basti and vice versa.

See also 

 Prayagraj Junction railway station
 Basti railway station

Notes

References

External links 

 14117/Manwar Sangam Express
 14118/Manwar Sangam Express

Trains from Allahabad
Named passenger trains of India
Railway services introduced in 2016
Express trains in India